The  is a Bo-Bo wheel arrangement DC electric locomotive type operated by the private railway operator Meitetsu in Aichi Prefecture, Japan, since 2015. The two locomotives, numbered 121 and 122, will replace the Meitetsu fleet of two DeKi 400 and four DeKi 600 locomotives during fiscal 2015.

History
The two locomotives 121 and 122 were delivered from the Toshiba factory in Fuchu, Tokyo to Meitetsu's Maigi Maintenance Depot on 1 February 2015.

References

Further reading
 

EL120
Electric locomotives of Japan
Bo-Bo locomotives
1500 V DC locomotives
Toshiba locomotives
1067 mm gauge locomotives of Japan
Railway locomotives introduced in 2015